Term Htra may refer to:

 High time-resolution astrophysics, a section of astronomy/astrophysics
 Peptidase Do, an enzyme